NFIC may refer to:
NFIC (gene)
National Fire Information Council, United States